The Central Methodist Episcopal Church South, now the First United Methodist Church, is a historic church building at 1100 Central Avenue in Hot Springs, Arkansas.  It is a single story masonry structure with a restrained Gothic Revival exterior, and elements of the Carpenter Gothic on the interior.  It was designed by John Gaisford of Memphis, Tennessee, and was built in 1914-15 for a congregation established in 1852.  The building is a distinctive landmark on the outskirts of the city's downtown area.

The church was listed on the National Register of Historic Places in 2011.

See also
First Methodist Church Christian Education Building
National Register of Historic Places listings in Garland County, Arkansas

References

Churches on the National Register of Historic Places in Arkansas
Gothic Revival church buildings in Arkansas
Churches completed in 1914
Churches in Garland County, Arkansas
Buildings and structures in Hot Springs, Arkansas
National Register of Historic Places in Hot Springs, Arkansas